Debbe Leftwich is a politician from the U.S. state of Oklahoma. Leftwich was a member of the Oklahoma Senate from 2003 until 2010. She won the vacant seat through a special election after the death of her husband and former senator Keith Leftwich. She was a key figure in the 2010 Oklahoma political corruption investigation for her role in a bribery scheme in which she was accused of agreeing to not run for re-election in 2010 in exchange for a state job with the Office of the Chief Medical Examiner (OCME).

Early life
Born in Chandler, Oklahoma, Leftwitch grew up in Wellston, Oklahoma where she graduated from Wellston High School. Leftwich's interest in politics began in high school with various mentors encouraging her passion. She went on to attend Oklahoma Baptist University and the University of Central Oklahoma.

Political career
She was elected in a special election on December 9, 2003 to fill the vacancy from District 44 left by her husband, Senator Keith Leftwich, who died of cancer in September 2003. Leftwich was re-elected in 2006.

Senate Committees
Leftwich remained in office from 2003 until 2010.
 Appropriations Subcommittee on Public Safety and Judiciary
 Business and Labor - Co-Chair
 Criminal Jurisprudence
 Health and Human Resources
 Transportation

Corruption
Leftwich was a key figure in the 2010 Oklahoma political corruption investigation.

Boards, committees and commissions
Aside from her service in the Oklahoma Legislature, Leftwich spent her time serving in a number of various organizations, including:
 Chair of the Oklahoma Breast and Cervical Cancer Prevention and Treatment Advisory Committee
 Co-chair of Oklahoma Women’s Legislative Caucus
 Co-chair of Oklahoma’s Cancer Caucus
 Member of the Oklahoma Commission on Children & Youth’s Interagency Coordinating Council for Early Childhood Intervention
 Member of the Small Business Regulatory Review Committee
 Member of the Department of Labor’s Worker Safety Policy Council
 Governor’s appointee to the Oklahoma Health Information Security & Privacy Collaboration Steering Committee
 Member of the Oklahoma Commission on the Status of Women
 Member of the SKIL Board
 Member of the League of Women Voters
 Member of the American Legion Auxiliary
 Member of the South OKC Chamber of Commerce

Personal life
Leftwich and her late husband have two sons, Kevin and Kurt.

References

Malia K. Bennett, Debbe Leftwich: Following his Footsteps State Legislatures, October/November 2004

External links
Women of the Oklahoma Legislature Oral History Project -- OSU Library
2008 2006 2004 campaign contributions
 General Election November 7, 2006 Summary Results Oklahoma State Election Board

Year of birth missing (living people)
Living people
People from Chandler, Oklahoma
Oklahoma Baptist University alumni
University of Central Oklahoma alumni
Democratic Party Oklahoma state senators
Women state legislators in Oklahoma
21st-century American politicians
21st-century American women politicians
Oklahoma politicians convicted of crimes